The MV Karadeniz Powership Gökhan Bey is Liberia-flagged floating power plant, owned and operated by Karpowership. In 2016, she was solemnly sent off from the Sedef Shipyard in Tuzla, Istanbul, Turkey together with the MV Karadeniz Powership Yasin Bey to Indonesia to supply electricity to the power grid. She has a generation capacity of 125 MW.

Cargo ship
The ship was built in 2000 as a general cargo carrier by Dalian Shipbuilding Industry Company in Dalian, Liaoning, China.

Powership
The Turkish company Karpowership purchased the general cargo ship. She was converted into a Powership at Sedef Shipyard in Tuzla, Istanbul, and renamed MV Karadeniz Powership Gökhan Bey with a generation capacity of 120 MW. On November 13, 2016, the Powership sailed to Indonesia in a ceremony attended by the President Recep Tayyip Erdoğan, Prime Minister Binali Yıldırım, Minister of Transport, Maritime and Communication Ahmet Arslan and other officials. She was commissioned to supply electricity to the power grid in Indonesia.

Ship's registry
 ex-MV HR Indication (2014–2016), owned by Hammonia Reederei, Hamburg, Germany
 ex-MV HHL Indication (2013–2014)
 ex-MV HR Indication (2011–2013)
 ex-MV Beluga Indication (2007–2011)
 ex-MV Nirint Iberia (2007)
 ex-MV Beluga Indication (2007)
 ex-MV Nirint Iberia (2006–2007)
 ex-MV Beluga Indication (2004–2006)
 ex-MV Cec Apollon (2000–2004)

References

2000 ships
Bulk carriers
Ships built in China
Ships of Liberia
Gokhan Bey
Electric power infrastructure in Indonesia
Ships built at Sedef Shipyard